Cermignano (locally Cirmignanë) is a town and comune in the province of Teramo in the Abruzzo region of eastern Italy.

References

Cities and towns in Abruzzo